Achillesaurus is a genus of alvarezsaurid theropod dinosaur  from the Santonian-age Upper Cretaceous Bajo de la Carpa Formation of Rio Negro, Argentina. It was named in reference to Achilles' heel, because diagnostic features are found there for these animals. The genus was a relatively large, basal alvarezsaurid, and a contemporary of Alvarezsaurus.  Achillesaurus is based on MACN-PV-RN 1116, a partial skeleton including a sacral vertebra, four tail vertebrae, part of the left thighbone, shin and foot, and the left ilium. Agustín Martinelli and Ezequiel Vera, who described the specimen, performed a phylogenetic analysis and found their new genus to be an alvarezsaurid with an unresolved relationship to Alvarezsaurus and more derived alvarezsaurids. Makovicky, Apesteguía & Gianechini (2012) argued that Achillesaurus might actually be a junior synonym of Alvarezsaurus which, according to the authors, "is known from the same formation and from which it [i.e. Achillesaurus] differs trivially."

References

External links
 Abstract and first page of the description (pdf)

Alvarezsaurids
Late Cretaceous dinosaurs of South America
Santonian life
Cretaceous Argentina
Fossils of Argentina
Bajo de la Carpa Formation
Fossil taxa described in 2007